Susan DiBona (born 18 February 1974) is an American-Italian film and television composer.

On February 18, 1974, DiBona was born in New Haven, Connecticut and resided in Clinton, Connecticut.
DiBona is fluent in eight languages.
DiBona has performed in Europe.
DiBona attended The Williams School.
DiBona has studied at Barnard College and Columbia University.

DiBona currently lives in Praia a Mare, Italy.

References

External links 
 http://www.thevillastudios.com/
 https://soundcloud.com/thevillastudios
 https://www.youtube.com/channel/UCp5E8uK0jyEUfgkHIS4RlHw
 https://www.allmusic.com/artist/susan-dibona-mn0001384545
 https://www.discogs.com/artist/4435248-Susan-Dibona
 

1974 births
21st-century American women musicians
American expatriates in Italy
American film score composers
American television composers
American women film score composers
Living people
Women television composers